The 1990–91 Utah Utes men's basketball team represented the University of Utah as a member of the Western Athletic Conference during the 1990–91 men's basketball season. Led by head coach Rick Majerus, the Utes made a run to the Sweet Sixteen of the NCAA tournament before falling to unbeaten UNLV in the West regional semifinals. The Utes finished with an overall record of 30–4 (15–1 WAC).

Roster

Schedule and results

|-
!colspan=9 style= | Non-conference regular season

|-
!colspan=9 style= | WAC regular season

|-
!colspan=9 style= | WAC Tournament

|-
!colspan=9 style= | NCAA Tournament

Rankings

Awards and honors
Josh Grant – WAC Player of the Year

References

Utah Utes men's basketball seasons
Utah
Utah
Utah Utes
Utah Utes